Gayatri  (born 23 April 1960) is an Indian actress from Punjab who is known for heroine roles in Kannada movies like Auto Raja (1980), Vasantha Geetha (1980), Sukha Samsarakke Hanneradu Sutragalu (1984), Jwaalamukhi (1985) and Shwetha Gulabi (1985). She is married to actor Anant Nag.

Personal life
Gayatri married actor Ananth Nag on 9 April 1987. They have a daughter, Aditi

Filmography

Hindi

Victoria No. 203 as Baby Gayatri
Tapasya (1976)
Mera Rakshak (1978)
Safed Haathi (1978)
Muqaddar Ka Sikander (1979)
Sunayana (1980)
Thodisi Bewafaii (1980)

Kannada

Auto Raja (1980)
Vasantha Geetha (1980)
Aarada Gaaya (1980)
Rusthum Jodi (1980)
Kula Puthra (1981)
Indina Ramayana (1984)
Makkaliralavva Mane Thumba (1984)
Sukha Samsarakke Hanneradu Suthragalu (1984)
Olave Baduku (1984)
Khiladi Aliya (1985)
Maanava Daanava(1985)
Maha Purusha (1985)
Shwetha Gulabi (1985) 
Jwaalamukhi (1985)
Hendti Beku Hendti (1985)
Ade Kannu (1985)
Vajra Mushti (1985)

Preethi (1986)
Rasthe Raja (1986)
Thayi (1987)
Agni Parva (1987)
Abhimana (1989)
Ramarajyadalli Rakshasaru (1990)

Telugu
Mogudu Kaavali (1980)

Tamil
Auto Raja (1982) ... Rani
Sigappu Malargal (1986)

See also

List of Indian film actresses
Cinema of Karnataka
Cinema of India

References

External links 
 

1960 births
Actresses from Punjab, India
Living people
Indian film actresses
Actresses in Kannada cinema
20th-century Indian actresses